The 2014–15 Liga Bet season saw Hapoel Kafr Kanna (champions of the North A division), Hapoel Baqa al-Gharbiyye (champions of the North B division), Hapoel Bik'at HaYarden (champions of the South A division) and Bnei Eilat (champions of the South B division) win the title and promotion to Liga Alef.

The clubs ranked 2nd to 5th in each division entered a promotion play-off, at the end of which, Hapoel Iksal (from the North section) and Hapoel Kiryat Ono (from the South section) met the teams ranked 14th in Liga Alef. Hapoel Iksal won their tie and was promoted to Liga Alef as well, while Hapoel Kiryat Ono lost and remained in Liga Bet.

At the bottom, Hapoel Ironi Bnei I'billin (from North A division) and Otzma F.C. Holon (from South A division) were automatically relegated to Liga Gimel. Hapoel Umm al-Ghanem Nein (from North B division) and Hapoel Arad (form South B division) folded during the season, leaving their respective divisions with 15 teams.

The clubs ranked 12th to 15th in each division entered a relegation play-off, at the end of which Ahva Arraba (from North A division), Bnei Nujeidat (from North B division), Maccabi Bnei Jaljulia (from South A division) and F.C. Bnei Ra'anana (from South B division) dropped to Liga Gimel as well.

North A Division

North B Division

South A Division

South B Division

Promotion play-offs

Northern Divisions

Hapoel Iksal qualified to the promotion play-off match against 14th ranked club in Liga Alef North division, Hapoel Asi Gilboa.

Southern Divisions

Hapoel Kiryat Ono qualified to the promotion play-off match against 14th ranked club in Liga Alef South division, Maccabi Kabilio Jaffa.

Promotion play-off Matches

North section

Hapoel Iksal Promoted to Liga Alef; Hapoel Asi Gilboa relegated to Liga Bet; However, they were eventually reprieved from relegation, following the merger between Hapoel Hadera and F.C. Givat Olga.

South Section

Maccabi Kabilio Jaffa remained in Liga Alef; Hapoel Kiryat Ono remained in Liga Bet.

Relegation play-offs

Northern divisions

North A division

Ahva Arraba relegated to Liga Gimel

North B division

Hapoel Bnei Nujeidat relegated to Liga Gimel

Southern divisions

South A division

Maccabi Bnei Jaljulia relegated to Liga Gimel

South B division

F.C. Bnei Ra'anana relegated to Liga Gimel

References

External links
The Israel Football Association 
The Israel Football Association 
The Israel Football Association 
The Israel Football Association 

Liga Bet seasons
4
Israel